The 2013–14 Miami Heat season was the 26th season of the franchise in the National Basketball Association (NBA). They entered the season as three-time defending Eastern Conference champions and as two-time defending NBA champions, having defeated the Oklahoma City Thunder in the 2012 NBA Finals in five games and the San Antonio Spurs in the 2013 NBA Finals in seven games. In defeating the Spurs in 2013, the Heat handed the Spurs their first-ever series loss in the NBA Finals.

The 2013–2014 season was the Heat's fourth and final season playing with the "Big Three" of LeBron James, Dwyane Wade, and Chris Bosh, and ended with a 54–28 record, despite a 43–14 record early in March. It was the lowest record (.659) in the Big Three era (with the exception of the 2011–12 NBA season, which was a shortened season due to a lockout). It was also their sixth season under head coach Erik Spoelstra and Ray Allen's last season in the NBA after 18 years in the league. Although he was a free agent during the 2014–15 and 2015–16 seasons, and despite rumors of a possible return to the league to play for the Milwaukee Bucks, Golden State Warriors, or Boston Celtics, Allen officially announced his retirement on November 1, 2016, and was one of two remaining active players from the 1996 draft, the other being Kobe Bryant, whom announced his retirement the season prior.

The Heat swept the Charlotte Bobcats in the first round and defeated the Brooklyn Nets in five games in the Conference Semifinals. In a rematch of the previous year's Eastern Conference Finals, the Heat defeated the Indiana Pacers in six games (ending the Pacers' season for the third year in a row) to become the first team to win four consecutive Eastern Conference championships since the Boston Celtics did so in the 1984–1987 seasons. Miami's quest for a three-peat ended when the San Antonio Spurs, whom they met in a rematch of the 2013 NBA Finals, won the NBA Finals by a 4–1 margin. Following the season, James left the Heat in free agency to rejoin the Cleveland Cavaliers, whom he previously played for from 2003 to 2010. This would also be the last time the Heat would appear in the Finals until 2020, wherein they lost to the Los Angeles Lakers (led by former Heat player James) 4 games to 2.

Key dates
 June 27: The 2013 NBA draft took place at Barclays Center in Brooklyn, New York.
 July 1: 2013 NBA free agency began.
 March 3: LeBron James had a career-high 61 points against the Charlotte Bobcats. His 61 points were also a franchise-high, breaking Glen Rice's record, who scored 56 points against the Orlando Magic in 1995.
 April 28: The Heat completed a sweep over the Charlotte Bobcats in the Eastern Conference first round, advancing to the Conference Semi-finals.
 May 14: The Heat avenged their regular-season sweep loss over the Brooklyn Nets in Game 5 of the Eastern Conference Semi-finals, by a game-saving steal by LeBron James from Joe Johnson. They advanced to the Eastern Conference Finals for the fourth consecutive year.
 May 30: The Heat defeated the Indiana Pacers in game six of the Eastern Conference Finals, to advance to the NBA Finals for the fourth consecutive year.
 June 15: Their season ended when they lost to the San Antonio Spurs in Game 5 of the 2014 NBA Finals, 104–87. Their loss also marked the first time that the Heat have been eliminated from title contention since their loss to the Dallas Mavericks in the 2011 NBA Finals.

Draft picks

The Heat did not have a pick in the 2013 NBA draft.

Future draft picks

Credits
2014 or 2015 first-round draft pick from Philadelphia

Philadelphia's first-round pick to Miami protected for selections 1-14 in 2014 or 1-14 in 2015; if Philadelphia has not conveyed a first-round pick to Miami by 2015, then Philadelphia will instead convey its 2015 2nd round pick and 2016 2nd round pick to Miami [Miami-Philadelphia, 6/28/2012]

Debits

2015 first round draft pick to Cleveland

Miami's 1st round pick to Cleveland protected for selections 1-10 in 2015 or 1-10 in 2016 or unprotected in 2017 [Cleveland-Miami, 7/9/2010]

2017 second-round draft pick to Atlanta

Miami's second-round pick to Atlanta protected for selections 31–40 in 2017 or unprotected in 2018 [Atlanta-Miami, 6/27/2013]

Roster

Pre-season

|- style="background:#cfc;"
| 1
| October 7
| Atlanta
| 
| Chris Bosh (21)
| Roger Mason, Jr. (6)
| LeBron James (5)
| American Airlines Arena19,600
| 1–0
|- style="background:#cfc;"
| 2
| October 10
| @ Detroit
| 
| Chris Bosh (28)
| Bosh, Wade, & Hamilton (4)
| LeBron James (7)
| Palace of Auburn Hills17,219
| 2–0
|- style="background:#cfc;"
| 3
| October 11
| Charlotte
| 
| LeBron James (20)
| Udonis Haslem (11)
| Chalmers & Cole (4)
| Sprint Center18,770
| 3–0
|- style="background:#fcc;"
| 4
| October 15
| @ Washington
| 
| Wade & Battier (14)
| Chris Bosh (8)
| James, Chalmers, & Cole (4)
| Verizon Center13,678
| 3–1
|- style="background:#fcc;"
| 5
| October 17
| @ Brooklyn
| 
| James & Bosh (16)
| Chris Bosh (9)
| James & Chalmers (4)
| Barclays Center17,732
| 3–2
|- style="background:#cfc;"
| 6
| October 19
| San Antonio
| 
| Dwyane Wade (25)
| Udonis Haslem (8)
| Dwyane Wade (7)
| American Airlines Arena20,080
| 4–2
|- style="background:#cfc;"
| 7
| October 23
| @ New Orleans
| 
| LeBron James (27)
| Chris Bosh (9)
| Bosh & Wade (7)
| New Orleans Arena17,123
| 5–2
|- style="background:#fcc;"
| 8
| October 25
| Brooklyn
| 
| Udonis Haslem (16)
| Michael Beasley (6)
| Mario Chalmers (6)
| American Airlines Arena19,600
| 5–3

Regular season

Standings

Game log

|- style="background:#cfc;"
| 1
| October 29
| Chicago
| 
| LeBron James (17)
| Chris Andersen (8)
| LeBron James (8)
| American Airlines Arena19,964
| 1–0
|- style="background:#fcc;"
| 2
| October 30
| @ Philadelphia
| 
| LeBron James (25)
| Chris Bosh (10)
| LeBron James (13)
| Wells Fargo Center19,523
| 1–1

|- style="background:#fcc;"
| 3
| November 1
| @ Brooklyn
| 
| LeBron James (26)
| LeBron James (7)
| LeBron James (6)
| Barclays Center17,732
| 1–2
|- style="background:#cfc;"
| 4
| November 3
| Washington
| 
| LeBron James (25)
| Chris Bosh (7)
| Mario Chalmers (8)
| American Airlines Arena19,600
| 2–2
|- style="background:#cfc;"
| 5
| November 5
| @ Toronto
| 
| LeBron James (35)
| LeBron James (8)
| LeBron James (8)
| Air Canada Centre18,470
| 3–2
|- style="background:#cfc;"
| 6
| November 7
| L.A. Clippers
| 
| Dwyane Wade (29)
| Chris Bosh (6)
| Dwyane Wade (7)
| American Airlines Arena19,600
| 4–2
|- style="background:#fcc;"
| 7
| November 9
| Boston
| 
| LeBron James (25)
| LeBron James (8)
| LeBron James (10)
| American Airlines Arena19,710
| 4–3
|- style="background:#cfc;"
| 8
| November 12
| Milwaukee
| 
| LeBron James (33)
| Wade & Andersen (7)
| Mario Chalmers (7)
| American Airlines Arena19,600
| 5–3
|- style="background:#cfc;"
| 9
| November 15
| Dallas
| 
| LeBron James (39)
| Chris Andersen (7)
| Dwyane Wade (8)
| American Airlines Arena19,772
| 6–3
|- style="background:#cfc;"
| 10
| November 16
| @ Charlotte
| 
| LeBron James (30)
| Rashard Lewis (9)
| LeBron James (7)
| Time Warner Cable Arena19,084
| 7–3
|- style="background:#cfc;"
| 11
| November 19
| Atlanta
| 
| Chris Bosh (19)
| LeBron James (6)
| Norris Cole (9)
| American Airlines Arena19,600
| 8–3
|- style="background:#cfc;"
| 12
| November 20
| @ Orlando
| 
| LeBron James (21)
| Michael Beasley (7)
| Mario Chalmers (8)
| Amway Center17,256
| 9–3
|- style="background:#cfc;"
| 13
| November 23
| Orlando
| 
| Dwyane Wade (27)
| LeBron James (9)
| LeBron James (7)
| American Airlines Arena19,647
| 10–3
|- style="background:#cfc;"
| 14
| November 25
| Phoenix
| 
| LeBron James (35)
| Chris Andersen (7)
| Dwyane Wade (12)
| American Airlines Arena15,758
| 11–3
|- style="background:#cfc;"
| 15
| November 27
| @ Cleveland
| 
| LeBron James (28)
| Michael Beasley (9)
| LeBron James (8)
| Quicken Loans Arena20,562
| 12–3
|- style="background:#cfc;"
| 16
| November 29
| @ Toronto
| 
| LeBron James (27)
| Dwyane Wade (7)
| Mario Chalmers (8)
| Air Canada Centre18,290
| 13–3

|- style="background:#cfc;"
| 17
| December 1
| Charlotte
| 
| LeBron James (26)
| Chris Bosh (9)
| Mario Chalmers (6)
| American Airlines Arena19,617
| 14–3
|- style="background:#fcc;"
| 18
| December 3
| Detroit
| 
| James & Beasley (23)
| Bosh & Lewis (6)
| James & Chalmers (6)
| American Airlines Arena19,741
| 14–4
|- style="background:#fcc;"
| 19
| December 5
| @ Chicago
| 
| LeBron James (21)
| Michael Beasley (7)
| Norris Cole (6)
| United Center22,125
| 14–5
|- style="background:#cfc;"
| 20
| December 7
| @ Minnesota
| 
| LeBron James (21)
| LeBron James (14)
| LeBron James (8)
| Target Center19,888
| 15–5
|- style="background:#cfc;"
| 21
| December 8
| @ Detroit
| 
| LeBron James (24)
| Chris Bosh (9)
| LeBron James (9)
| Palace of Auburn Hills18,034
| 16–5
|- style="background:#fcc;"
| 22
| December 10
| @ Indiana
| 
| James & Wade (17)
| LeBron James (14)
| James & Wade (6)
| Bankers Life Fieldhouse18,165
| 16–6
|- style="background:#cfc;"
| 23
| December 14
| Cleveland
| 
| LeBron James (25)
| Chris Bosh (12)
| LeBron James (9)
| American Airlines Arena19,656
| 17–6
|- style="background:#cfc;"
| 24
| December 16
| Utah
| 
| LeBron James (30)
| LeBron James (9)
| LeBron James (9)
| American Airlines Arena19,600
| 18–6
|- style="background:#cfc;"
| 25
| December 18
| Indiana
| 
| Dwyane Wade (32)
| LeBron James (9)
| LeBron James (7)
| American Airlines Arena19,898
| 19–6
|- style="background:#cfc;"
| 26
| December 20
| Sacramento
| 
| Chris Bosh (25)
| Chris Bosh (8)
| LeBron James (8)
| American Airlines Arena19,600
| 20–6
|- style="background:#cfc;"
| 27
| December 23
| Atlanta
| 
| LeBron James (38)
| Chris Andersen (9)
| LeBron James (6)
| American Airlines Arena20,204
| 21–6
|- style="background:#cfc;"
| 28
| December 25
| @ L.A. Lakers
| 
| Bosh & Wade (23)
| Chris Bosh (11)
| Wade & Chalmers (7)
| Staples Center18,997
| 22–6
|- style="background:#fcc;"
| 29
| December 27
| @ Sacramento
| 
| LeBron James (33)
| LeBron James (8)
| Mario Chalmers (10)
| Sleep Train Arena17,317
| 22–7
|- style="background:#cfc;"
| 30
| December 28
| @ Portland
| 
| Chris Bosh (37)
| Chris Bosh (10)
| Mario Chalmers (9)
| Moda Center20,071
| 23–7
|- style="background:#cfc;"
| 31
| December 30
| @ Denver
| 
| LeBron James (26)
| Ray Allen (7)
| LeBron James (10)
| Pepsi Center19,155
| 24–7

|- style="background:#fcc;"
| 32
| January 2
| Golden State
| 
| LeBron James (26)
| Mario Chalmers (7)
| James & Wade (5)
| American Airlines Arena20,350
| 24–8
|- style="background:#cfc;"
| 33
| January 4
| @ Orlando
| 
| Bosh & Wade (20)
| LeBron James (8)
| LeBron James (8)
| Amway Center18,846
| 25–8
|- style="background:#cfc;"
| 34
| January 5
| Toronto
| 
| LeBron James (30)
| Chris Bosh (11)
| LeBron James (5)
| American Airlines Arena20,020
| 26–8
|- style="background:#cfc;"
| 35
| January 7
| New Orleans
| 
| LeBron James (32)
| Chris Bosh (9)
| Dwyane Wade (8)
| American Airlines Arena20,097
| 27–8
|- style="background:#fcc;"
| 36
| January 9
| @ New York
| 
| LeBron James (32)
| Chris Bosh (9)
| LeBron James (6)
| Madison Square Garden19,812
| 27–9
|- style="background:#fcc;"
| 37
| January 10
| @ Brooklyn
| 
| LeBron James (36)
| Chris Bosh (10)
| Norris Cole (7)
| Barclays Center17,732
| 27–10
|- style="background:#fcc;"
| 38
| January 15
| @ Washington
| 
| Chris Bosh (26)
| LeBron James (8)
| James & Cole (7)
| Verizon Center20,356
| 27–11
|- style="background:#cfc;"
| 39
| January 17
| @ Philadelphia
| 
| Chris Bosh (25)
| LeBron James (8)
| LeBron James (10)
| Wells Fargo Center19,286
| 28–11
|- style="background:#cfc;"
| 40
| January 18
| @ Charlotte
| 
| LeBron James (34)
| Udonis Haslem (10)
| LeBron James (6)
| Time Warner Cable Arena19,631
| 29–11
|- style="background:#fcc;"
| 41
| January 20
| @ Atlanta
| 
| LeBron James (30)
| Bosh & Allen (7)
| Norris Cole (8)
| Philips Arena19,262
| 29–12
|- style="background:#cfc;"
| 42
| January 21
| Boston
| 
| LeBron James (29)
| LeBron James (8)
| Chalmers & Cole (6)
| American Airlines Arena19,619
| 30–12
|- style="background:#cfc;"
| 43
| January 23
| L.A. Lakers
| 
| Chris Bosh (31)
| LeBron James (13)
| LeBron James (6)
| American Airlines Arena19,608
| 31–12
|- style="background:#cfc;"
| 44
| January 26
| San Antonio
| 
| Chris Bosh (24)
| LeBron James (7)
| Mario Chalmers (7)
| American Airlines Arena19,683
| 32–12
|- style="background:#fcc;"
| 45
| January 29
| Oklahoma City
| 
| LeBron James (34)
| Chris Bosh (9)
| Mario Chalmers (8)
| American Airlines Arena19,673
| 32–13

|- style="background:#cfc;"
| 46
| February 1
| @ New York
| 
| LeBron James (30)
| Chris Bosh (10)
| LeBron James (7)
| Madison Square Garden19,812
| 33–13
|- style="background:#cfc;"
| 47
| February 3
| Detroit
| 
| Dwyane Wade (30)
| Dwyane Wade (10)
| LeBron James (11)
| American Airlines Arena19,802
| 34–13
|- style="background:#cfc;"
| 48
| February 5
|  @ L.A. Clippers
| 
| LeBron James (31)
| James & Bosh (8)
| LeBron James (12)
| Staples Center19,672
| 35–13
|- style="background:#fcc;"
| 49
| February 8
| @ Utah
| 
| Dwyane Wade (19)
| James & Bosh (7)
| Mario Chalmers (7)
| EnergySolutions Arena19,911
| 35–14
|- style="background:#cfc;"
| 50
| February 11
| @ Phoenix
| 
| LeBron James (37)
| LeBron James (9)
| James, Cole & Allen (3)
| US Airways Center17,927
| 36–14
|- style="background:#cfc;"
| 51
| February 12
| @ Golden State
| 
| LeBron James (36)
| LeBron James (13)
| LeBron James (9)
| Oracle Arena19,596
| 37–14
|- align="center"
|colspan="9" bgcolor="#bbcaff"|All-Star Break
|- style="background:#cfc;"
| 52
| February 18
| @ Dallas
| 
| LeBron James (42)
| LeBron James (9)
| Mario Chalmers (9)
| American Airlines Center20,461
| 38–14
|- style="background:#cfc;"
| 53
| February 20
| @ Oklahoma City
| 
| LeBron James (33)
| Dwyane Wade (10)
| Bosh & Andersen (8)
| Chesapeake Energy Arena18,203
| 39–14
|- style="background:#cfc;"
| 54
| February 23
| Chicago
| 
| Chris Bosh (28)
| Bosh & Wade (10)
| Mario Chalmers (9)
| American Airlines Arena19,848
| 40–14
|- style="background:#cfc;"
| 55
| February 27
| New York
| 
| LeBron James (31)
| Bosh & Andersen (7)
| Shane Battier (5)
| American Airlines Arena19,634
| 41–14

|- style="background:#cfc;"
| 56
| March 1
| Orlando
| 
| Dwyane Wade (24)
| LeBron James (9)
| LeBron James (7)
| American Airlines Arena19,834
| 42–14
|- style="background:#cfc;"
| 57
| March 3
| Charlotte
| 
| LeBron James (61)
| James & Bosh (7)
| Mario Chalmers (7)
| American Airlines Arena19,727
| 43–14
|- style="background:#fcc;"
| 58
| March 4
| @ Houston
| 
| Wade & Beasley (24)
| Chris Andersen (7)
| James & Wade (6)
| Toyota Center18,523
| 43–15
|- style="background:#fcc;"
| 59
| March 6
| @ San Antonio
| 
| Chris Bosh (24)
| LeBron James (8)
| James & Wade (7)
| AT&T Center18,581
| 43–16
|- style="background:#fcc;"
| 60
| March 9
| @ Chicago
| 
| Dwyane Wade (25)
| Chris Andersen (13)
| LeBron James (8)
| United Center22,028
| 43–17
|- style="background:#cfc;"
| 61
| March 10
| Washington
| 
| LeBron James (23)
| James & Bosh (7)
| LeBron James (8)
| American Airlines Arena19,657
| 44–17
|- style="background:#fcc;"
| 62
| March 12
| Brooklyn
| 
| Chris Bosh (24)
| Mario Chalmers (9)
| LeBron James (7)
| American Airlines Arena19,616
| 44–18
|- style="background:#fcc;"
| 63
| March 14
| Denver
| 
| Ray Allen (22)
| Chris Bosh (8)
| James, Chalmers & Wade (6)
| American Airlines Arena19,600
| 44–19
|- style="background:#cfc;"
| 64
| March 16
| Houston
| 
| Ray Allen (25)
| Chris Bosh (8)
| Dwyane Wade (7)
| American Airlines Arena19,666
| 45–19
|- style="background:#cfc;"
| 65
| March 18
| @ Cleveland
| 
| LeBron James (43)
| Chris Andersen (8)
| Mario Chalmers (9)
| Quicken Loans Arena20,562
| 46–19
|- style="background:#fcc;"
| 66
| March 19
| @ Boston
| 
| Dwyane Wade (17)
| Chris Bosh (11)
| Mario Chalmers (11)
| TD Garden18,624
| 46–20
|- style="background:#cfc;"
| 67
| March 21
| Memphis
| 
| Ray Allen (18)
| LeBron James (6)
| LeBron James (7)
| American Airlines Arena20,007
| 47–20
|- style="background:#fcc;"
| 68
| March 22
| @ New Orleans
| 
| LeBron James (25)
| LeBron James (8)
| LeBron James (9)
| Smoothie King Center18,185
| 47–21
|- style="background:#cfc;"
| 69
| March 24
| Portland
| 
| LeBron James (32)
| Chris Andersen (11)
| LeBron James (5)
| American Airlines Arena20,030
| 48–21
|- style="background:#fcc;"
| 70
| March 26
| @ Indiana
| 
| LeBron James (38)
| LeBron James (8)
| LeBron James (5)
| Bankers Life Fieldhouse18,165
| 48–22
|- style="background:#cfc;"
| 71
| March 28
| @ Detroit
| 
| James & Haslem (17)
| LeBron James (10)
| LeBron James (12)
| Palace of Auburn Hills21,231
| 49-22
|- style="background:#cfc;"
| 72
| March 29
| @ Milwaukee
| 
| Chris Bosh (14)
| Chris Andersen (14)
| Douglas & Cole (4)
| BMO Harris Bradley Center17,986
| 50-22
|- style="background:#cfc;"
| 73
| March 31
| Toronto
| 
| LeBron James (32)
| James & Andersen (7)
| LeBron James (8)
| American Airlines Arena19,831
| 51-22

|- style="background:#cfc;"
| 74
| April 2
| Milwaukee
| 
| LeBron James (17)
| Douglas & Andersen (7)
| LeBron James (8)
| American Airlines Arena19,609
| 52-22
|- style="background:#fcc;"
| 75
| April 4
| Minnesota
| 
| LeBron James (34)
| Chris Bosh (9)
| Mario Chalmers (6)
| American Airlines Arena19,661
| 52-23
|- style="background:#cfc;"
| 76
| April 6
| New York
| 
| LeBron James (38)
| Udonis Haslem (11)
| LeBron James (6)
| American Airlines Arena19,647
| 53-23
|- style="background:#fcc;"
| 77
| April 8
| Brooklyn
| 
| LeBron James (29)
| LeBron James (10)
| LeBron James (6)
| American Airlines Arena19,600
| 53-24
|- style="background:#fcc;"
| 78
| April 9
| @ Memphis
| 
| LeBron James (37)
| James & Bosh (6)
| James, Douglas & Cole (5)
| FedExForum18,119
| 53–25
|- style="background:#cfc;"
| 79
| April 11
| Indiana
| 
| LeBron James (36)
| Udonis Haslem (9)
| Mario Chalmers (5)
| American Airlines Arena20,300
| 54–25
|- style="background:#fcc;"
| 80
| April 12
| @ Atlanta
| 
| LeBron James (27)
| Haslem & James (8)
| LeBron James (5)
| Philips Arena19,287
| 54–26
|- style="background:#fcc;"
| 81
| April 14
| @ Washington
| 
| Michael Beasley (18)
| Udonis Haslem (8)
| Norris Cole (7)
| Verizon Center20,356
| 54–27
|- style="background:#fcc;"
| 82
| April 16
| Philadelphia
| 
| Dwyane Wade (16)
| Udonis Haslem (10)
| Douglas & Wade (4)
| American Airlines Arena20,350
| 54–28

Playoffs

Game log

|- style="background:#cfc;"
| 1
| April 20
| Charlotte
|  
| LeBron James (27)
| Chris Andersen (10)
| Dwyane Wade (5)
| American Airlines Arena19,640
| 1–0
|- style="background:#cfc;"
| 2
| April 23
| Charlotte
| 
| LeBron James (32)
| James & Wade (6)
| LeBron James (8)
| American Airlines Arena19,603
| 2–0
|- style="background:#cfc;"
| 3
| April 26
| @ Charlotte
| 
| LeBron James (30)
| LeBron James (10)
| James & Wade (6)
| Time Warner Cable Arena19,633
| 3–0
|- style="background:#cfc;"
| 4
| April 28
| @ Charlotte
| 
| LeBron James (31)
| Chris Bosh (8)
| LeBron James (9)
| Time Warner Cable Arena19,092
| 4–0

|- style="background:#cfc;"
| 1
| May 6
| Brooklyn
| 
| LeBron James (22)
| Chris Bosh (11)
| Dwyane Wade (5)
| American Airlines Arena19,470
| 1–0
|- style="background:#cfc;"
| 2
| May 8
| Brooklyn
| 
| LeBron James (22)
| Ray Allen (8)
| Dwyane Wade (7)
| American Airlines Arena19,639
| 2–0
|- style="background:#fcc;"
| 3
| May 10
| @ Brooklyn
| 
| LeBron James (28)
| LeBron James (8)
| LeBron James (5)
| Barclays Center17,732
| 2–1
|- style="background:#cfc;"
| 4
| May 12
| @ Brooklyn
| 
| LeBron James (49)
| Ray Allen (7)
| Mario Chalmers (7)
| Barclays Center17,732
| 3–1
|- style="background:#cfc;"
| 5
| May 14
| Brooklyn
| 
| LeBron James (29)
| LeBron James (9)
| Mario Chalmers (7)
| American Airlines Arena19,615
| 4–1

|- style="background:#fcc;"
| 1
| May 18
| @ Indiana
| 
| Dwyane Wade (27)
| LeBron James (10)
| James & Chalmers (5)
| Bankers Life Fieldhouse18,165
| 0–1
|- style="background:#cfc;"
| 2
| May 20
| @ Indiana
| 
| Dwyane Wade (23)
| Chris Andersen (12)
| LeBron James (6)
| Bankers Life Fieldhouse18,165
| 1–1
|- style="background:#cfc;"
| 3
| May 24
| Indiana
| 
| LeBron James (26)
| Chris Andersen (7)
| LeBron James (7)
| American Airlines Arena20,025
| 2–1
|- style="background:#cfc;"
| 4
| May 26
| Indiana
| 
| LeBron James (32)
| LeBron James (10)
| LeBron James (5)
| American Airlines Arena19,874
| 3–1
|- style="background:#fcc;"
| 5
| May 28
| @ Indiana
| 
| Chris Bosh (20)
| Chris Bosh (10)
| Dwyane Wade (7)
| Bankers Life Fieldhouse18,165
| 3–2
|- style="background:#cfc;"
| 6
| May 30
| Indiana
| 
| Bosh & James (25)
| Chris Andersen (10)
| Wade & James (6)
| American Airlines Arena20,021
| 4–2

|- style="background:#fcc;"
| 1
| June 5
| @ San Antonio
| 
| LeBron James (25)
| Chris Bosh (9)
| Norris Cole (5)
| AT&T Center18,581
| 0–1
|- style="background:#cfc;"
| 2
| June 8
| @ San Antonio
| 
| LeBron James (35)
| LeBron James (10)
| Chalmers & Wade (4)
| AT&T Center18,581
| 1–1
|- style="background:#fcc;"
| 3
| June 10
| San Antonio
| 
| James & Wade (22)
| James & Andersen (5)
| LeBron James (7)
| American Airlines Arena19,900
| 1–2
|- style="background:#fcc;"
| 4
| June 12
| San Antonio
| 
| LeBron James (28)
| LeBron James (8)
| Mario Chalmers (5)
| American Airlines Arena19,900
| 1–3
|- style="background:#fcc;"
| 5
| June 15
| @ San Antonio
| 
| LeBron James (31)
| LeBron James (10)
| LeBron James (5)
| AT&T Center18,581
| 1–4

Player statistics

Transactions

Overview

Free agents

References

External links

Miami
Miami Heat seasons
Eastern Conference (NBA) championship seasons
Miami Heat
Miami Heat